Jablan may refer to:

 Jablan, Slovenia, a village near Mirna Peč, Slovenia
 Jablan, Croatia, a village near Vrbovsko, Croatia
 Jablan (Donji Vakuf), a village in Bosnia and Herzegovina